Starbuck is a surname. Notable people with the surname include:

D. H. Starbuck (1818–1887), American lawyer and politician
Dorothy L. Starbuck (1917-1996), American Army officer and civil servant
Edwin Diller Starbuck (1866-1947), American educational psychologist
George Starbuck (1931–1996), American poet
Georgie Starbuck Galbraith (1909–1980), American poet
Henry F. Starbuck (1860–1935), American architect
James F. Starbuck (1816–1880), New York politician
JoJo Starbuck (born 1951), American figure skater
Paul Starbuck (born 1967), Australian rules footballer
Phil Starbuck (born 1968), English footballer
Raymond Starbuck (c.1878–1965), American football player and railroad executive
William H. Starbuck (born 1934), organizational scientist
Michael Majalahti ("Starbuck the Canadian Rebel") (born 1973), Finnish professional wrestler and rock singer
Starbuck (whaling family) of Nantucket, Massachusetts, credited with the discovery of various Pacific Islands

See also
 Roger Staubach, American football player